Nick Allegretti (born April 21, 1996) is an American football guard for the Kansas City Chiefs of the National Football League (NFL). He played college football at Illinois.

Early years 
Allegretti attended Lincoln-Way East High School in Frankfort, Illinois, a suburb of Chicago. While there, he played for both the school's football and wrestling programs. As an offensive lineman, he was an all-state selection twice, and was a state finalist in wrestling.

College career 
Allegretti played as an offensive lineman for the Illinois Fighting Illini, starting as a freshman in the 2014 season. He remained with the Illinois program for the entirety of his collegiate career, with the 2018 season being his last with the team. He redshirted his first season at Illinois. Afterwards, he would play in 48 consecutive games, including as a starter in the last 36 games of his collegiate career.

Professional career
Allegretti was selected by the Kansas City Chiefs in the seventh round with the 216th overall pick in the 2019 NFL Draft. Allegretti played seven games during his rookie season of 2019. He won Super Bowl LIV with the Chiefs when they defeated the San Francisco 49ers by a score of 31–20.

He scored his first touchdown against the Pittsburgh Steelers on January 16, 2022.

Allegretti became a Super Bowl champion for the second time when the Chiefs defeated the Philadelphia Eagles in Super Bowl LVII 38-35.

On March 17, 2023, Allegretti re-signed with the Chiefs.

References

External links
Kansas City Chiefs bio
Illinois Fighting Illini bio

1996 births
Living people
American people of Italian descent
People from Frankfort, Illinois
Players of American football from Illinois
Sportspeople from the Chicago metropolitan area
Sportspeople from Cook County, Illinois
American football offensive guards
Illinois Fighting Illini football players
Kansas City Chiefs players